is a Paralympic swimmer from Japan competing mainly in S12 category events.

Koshiro competed in the 2000 and 2004 Summer Paralympics as part of the Japanese swimming team.  At the 2000 games he was part of the squad that broke the world record in winning the  medley, he also swam in the 100m breaststroke finishing seventh and the  50m, 100m and 400m freestyle events but failed to make the final.  At the 2004 games he swam in the 200m individual medley, 100m butterfly and 100m breaststroke failing to make the final in any of them.

References

External links
 

Paralympic swimmers of Japan
Swimmers at the 2000 Summer Paralympics
Swimmers at the 2004 Summer Paralympics
Paralympic gold medalists for Japan
Japanese male butterfly swimmers
Japanese male breaststroke swimmers
Japanese male medley swimmers
Japanese male freestyle swimmers
Living people
Medalists at the 2000 Summer Paralympics
Year of birth missing (living people)
Paralympic medalists in swimming
S12-classified Paralympic swimmers
20th-century Japanese people
21st-century Japanese people